Jennifer Mistry Bansiwal is an Indian actress. She is best known for portraying Roshan Daruwala Kaur Sodhi in the long-running Hindi television sitcom Taarak Mehta Ka Ooltah Chashmah. She has also appeared in the films; Halla Bol (2008), and Airlift (2016). Jennifer was born to a Parsi father and Christian mother.

Filmography

See also 
List of Hindi television actresses

References

External links

 

Actresses from Madhya Pradesh
Living people
Indian television actresses
People from Jabalpur
Actresses in Hindi cinema
Actresses in Hindi television
Indian film actresses
21st-century Indian actresses
Year of birth missing (living people)